Vasava is a surname. Notable people with the surname include:

Chhotubhai Vasava (born 1945), Indian politician
Ganpatsinh Vestabhai Vasava (born 1971), Indian politician
Mansukhbhai Vasava (born 1957), Indian politician
Motilal Puniyabhi Vasava, Indian politician
Parbhubhai Vasava (born 1970), Indian politician